Gate crashing, gatecrashing, or party crashing is the act of entering, attending, or participating in an event without an invitation nor ticket.
The person doing the gate crashing is known as a gate crasher or  party crasher.

Motivations for gate crashing include but are not limited to:
Avoiding entry fees 
Gaining access to free food, beverages (often alcoholic) or party favors
Gaining access to a private event
Taking photos/video of celebrities (see paparazzi)
Thrill seeking
Gatecrashing may occur alongside other more serious crimes, such as theft, looting, rape, fraud, murder, stalking, kidnapping and causing general disruptions to gain attention.

Various techniques that involve blending in with the crowd can be used to gain access to some events. Examples of blending in can include wearing the proper attire or participating in the event activities. Various measures can be taken to prevent gate crashers from gaining access such as increasing security, requiring credentials or checking invitations at the door. Regardless of prevention, such measures can still be thwarted by a skilled gate crasher.

The first "how to" gate-crashing book, Meet the Stars, was written by Charlotte Laws in 1988. She went by the name Missy Laws at the time and details how she crashed dozens of celebrity-filled events, major award shows and even got past Secret Service to interview the president. Her story about Elvis was reprinted in Uncle John's Bathroom Reader. Her memoirs, Undercover Debutante (2019) and Rebel in High Heels (2015), include some of her gate crashing escapades.

Notable gate-crashing incidents

2009 White House gatecrash incident 

On November 24, 2009, Michaele and Tareq Salahi, from Virginia, and Carlos Allen, from Washington D.C., independently gate-crashed the state dinner between President Barack Obama and Indian Prime Minister Manmohan Singh.

2013 Australian incident
On 7 September 2013, after media reported the results of the 2013 Australian federal elections which saw the Liberal Party of Australia and National Party of Australia Coalition, a gatecrasher and anti-coal activist gatecrashed Coalition leader and Prime Minister-designate Tony Abbott's victory speech on stage.

Wedding crashing 
Wedding crashing is the act of attending a wedding celebration without an invitation, particularly when the person or persons who turn up have a profound impact.

Motivations 
There are various reasons why people crash weddings.

Some of the most common reasons for crashing a wedding most commonly include:
To see a person they know, such as a relative, friend, or ex get married, even if they are not invited.
To come with another person who is invited whom they wish to accompany.
For something that is offered at the event, such as free catered food or alcoholic beverages. Crashing for this reason is not always cost-effective. With the high cost of the clothes required for a formal wedding (presuming one doesn't rewear them), this may out-do that of the food, which often can be obtained for less from a restaurant.
To steal money or gifts from the bride, groom, or guests.
For the thrill of deviating from mores and etiquette or for the social prestige within a peer group of defying the broader culture.
To try to "win back" the bride/groom who was a former lover and/or current romantic-interest of the crasher (such as in The Graduate and Wayne's World 2), or to cause discomfort/humiliation/problems by the presence of an "ex" at the wedding to someone else. 
To get revenge, such as if the bride or groom is an enemy of the person doing the crashing.
At celebrity weddings, crashing may occur from those who wish to mingle with the celebrities or catch paparazzi photo shots. There have also been reports of celebrities crashing the weddings of strangers they encounter.

Methods 
Most weddings are low profile family-oriented events, and security is low, so it is not checked whether or not a person who enters belongs. With the large number of people in attendance, coupled with the fact that not everyone knows each other or the bride and groom, a well-dressed person may be able to sneak in unnoticed. Wedding planners recommend having some form of security to be sure one does not enter the reception without an invitation when the likelihood of someone crashing may be high.

Some people manage to crash a wedding by entering in the middle of a ceremony or reception after all the checking has been done, or by greeting the couple and appearing to be a part of the invitee list.

Some who crash do so only to eat the hors d'oeuvres. This enables the crasher to remain even more under the radar. At a sit-down reception, there is usually assigned seating by place cards, and finding a seat may be difficult, especially when there are no-shows, or when determining which seats are vacant may be difficult. Crashing only for the hors d'oeuvres enables the crasher to eat while blending in.

Sometimes the crashing of a wedding is unintentional; this can happen when multiple weddings are held at the same venue.

See also

Peter Hore
Piggybacking (security)
Wedding Crashers – 2005 romantic comedy film

References

Security breaches
Wedding
Deception